This is a list of colleges and universities in the U.S. state of Rhode Island. There are currently 13 accredited, degree-granting institutions operating in the state, including two research universities, a community college, and a school of art.

Two of the state's public institutions are administered by the Rhode Island Board Board of Education. The other, the University of Rhode Island, is overseen by its own Board of Trustees. The state operates two public universities, the University of Rhode Island and Rhode Island College, as well as the Community College of Rhode Island, which offers degrees at six locations. The Naval War College, operated by the federal United States Navy, is located in Newport. The oldest school in the state is Brown University, a member of the Ivy League and the only Rhode Island institution founded before the American Revolution. The newest college is College Unbound, a degree completion school in Providence. Enrollment sizes range from College Unbound at 208 students to the University of Rhode Island, the state's flagship public university, with 20,720 students. 

The institutions included on this list are all regionally accredited by the New England Commission of Higher Education.

Institutions

Defunct institutions

See also

 Higher education in the United States
 List of college athletic programs in Rhode Island
 List of American institutions of higher education

Notes 

The types listed here are as categorized in the Carnegie Classification of Institutions of Higher Education.

Enrollment is the total 12-month unduplicated headcount listed by IPEDS for 2020–2021.

The enrollment count for Johnson & Wales University does not include 2,923 students in its distance learning programs.

The Naval War College is not categorized by the Carnegie Classification. However, it is comparable to the Naval Postgraduate School, which is categorized as a masters university.

The enrollment count for the Naval War College is for the 2021–2022 academic year and does not include 5,257 students in their distance learning programs.

The enrollment count for Roger Williams University includes 524 students at the School of Law, which is listed as a separate school in IPEDS.

References

External links
Department of Education listing of accredited institutions in Rhode Island

 
Rhode Island
Universities and colleges